Onon is an impact crater on Mars, located in the Amenthes quadrangle at 16.3° N and 257.6° W. It measures 3.5 kilometer in diameter and was named after Onon, a town in Mongolia. Impact craters generally have a rim with ejecta around them, in contrast volcanic craters usually do not have a rim or ejecta deposits. As craters get larger (greater than 10 km in diameter) they usually have a central peak. The peak is caused by a rebound of the crater floor following the impact.  Sometimes craters expose layers that were buried. Rocks from deep underground are tossed onto the surface. Hence, craters can show us what lies deep under the surface.

See also 

 Impact crater
 Impact event
 Inverted relief
 List of craters on Mars
 Ore resources on Mars
 Planetary nomenclature

References 

Impact craters on Mars
Amenthes quadrangle